Salinas High School is a public 9–12 high school in Salinas, California, United States.  It is the first of five primary high schools of the Salinas Union High School District.  The school was moved to its current central Salinas location in 1920. The campus was rebuilt circa 1999. While most buildings were demolished and replaced, the original main wing and bell tower were retained and renovated. The current principal is Elizabeth Duethman, with assistants Hugo Mariscal, Ernesto Pacleb, Vivian Moises, and Anthony Morales. As of the 2019–2020 school year the school enrolled 2700 students. Its campus is situated in a rural and suburban setting. The Salinas Cowboys compete in the Pacific Coast Athletic League of the CIF Central Coast Section. The school colors are purple and gold.

Notable alumni
Ryan Jensen - pitcher for MLB's Chicago Cubs organization
Joe Kapp – quarterback, played in Canadian Football League (CFL) and in NFL with Minnesota Vikings and Boston Patriots; coached Cal football
Rick Law – Disney artist and producer
Van Partible – creator of Johnny Bravo 
Gary Shipman – comic book artist and creator of Pakkins' Land
Brendon Small – founder of Dethklok
Evan Smith – center for NFL's Tampa Bay Buccaneers
Cristian Soratos – professional runner
Edward Soriano, retired United States Army Lieutenant General
John Steinbeck – iconic novelist, The Grapes of Wrath (1939) and East of Eden (1952) and novella Of Mice and Men (1937) (former class president)
Miles Teves – artist and conceptual designer on television productions, films, and computer games

References

High schools in Monterey County, California
Public high schools in California
Education in Salinas, California
Buildings and structures in Salinas, California
1882 establishments in California